Just Dance Kids may refer to:

 Just Dance Kids (2010 video game), known as Dance Juniors in Europe, a 2010 dancing video game
 Just Dance Kids 2, known as Just Dance Kids in Europe, a 2011 dancing video game
 Just Dance Kids 2014, a 2013 dancing video game